The Yugoslav Olympic Committee was the non-profit organization representing Yugoslav athletes in the International Olympic Committee. The YOC organized Yugoslavia's representatives at the Summer and Winter Olympic Games.

It was established in Zagreb in 1919 (recognized by the IOC in 1920) as Jugoslavenski olimpijski odbor, before moving to Belgrade in 1927, and it took the place of the Serbian Olympic Committee in the Association of National Olympic Committees. During the dissolution of Yugoslavia, several new committees were formed, while committee of newly formed Federal Republic of Yugoslavia (constituted by Serbia and Montenegro in 1992) kept the previous name, the Yugoslav Olympic Committee, until the change of the name of the country in 2003, from FRY to Serbia and Montenegro, when it changed to Olympic committee of Serbia and Montenegro.

Successors
Slovenian Olympic Committee (OKS) (est. 1991, recognized in 1992)
Croatian Olympic Committee (HOK) (est. 1991, recognized in 1993)
Olympic Committee of Bosnia and Herzegovina (OKBiH) (est. 1992, recognized in 1993)
Olympic Committee of North Macedonia (MOK) (est. 1992, recognized in 1993)
Olympic Committee of Serbia and Montenegro (OKSCG) (1992–2006)
Montenegrin Olympic Committee (COK) (est. 2006, recognized in 2007)
Olympic Committee of Serbia (OKS) (1910–1918; est. 2006)
Olympic Committee of Kosovo (KOK) (est. 1992, recognized in 2014)

See also
Yugoslavia at the Olympics
List of Yugoslav Olympic medalists

Former National Olympic Committees
 
Oly
Sports organizations established in 1919
1919 establishments in Yugoslavia